600 South is a light rail station in Downtown Salt Lake City, Utah, United States, served by all three lines of Utah Transit Authority's TRAX light rail system. The Blue Line provides service from Downtown Salt Lake City to Draper. The Red Line provides service from the University of Utah to the Daybreak community of South Jordan. The Green Line provides service from the Salt Lake City International Airport to West Valley City (via Downtown Salt Lake City). The station opened on July 26, 2022, and is operated by the Utah Transit Authority.

Description 
The station is located at 650 South Main Street. The island platform, capable of serving up to four-car trains, is located in the median of Main Street between 600 South and 700 South. This station is operated by Utah Transit Authority.

History 
In the late 1990s, the first master plan for TRAX included plans for a station at 600 South. When the rails were first laid, planners left enough room for the eventual station. Construction began in August 2021 with plans to be completed in early 2022.

The 600 South station is the first TRAX station built since the extensions of the Blue and Green lines in 2013.

References 

TRAX (light rail) stations
Railway stations in the United States opened in 2022
Railway stations in Salt Lake City
2022 establishments in Utah